Clube Atlético Ferroviário, commonly known as Ferroviário, were a Brazilian football team from Curitiba, Paraná state. They won the Campeonato Paranaense eight times.

History
Clube Atlético Ferroviário were founded on January 12, 1930. They won the Campeonato Paranaense in 1937, 1938, 1944, 1948, 1950, 1953, 1965, and in 1966. The club fused with Britânia Sport Club and Palestra Itália Futebol Clube in 1971, forming Colorado Esporte Clube. Subsequently, it joined Esporte Clube Pinheiros (PR), forming Paraná Clube.

Stadium
Clube Atlético Ferroviário played their home games at Estádio Durival Britto. The stadium has a maximum capacity of 20,000 people.

Achievements

 Campeonato Paranaense:
 Winners (8): 1937, 1938, 1944, 1948, 1950, 1953, 1965, 1966

References

Defunct football clubs in Paraná (state)
Association football clubs established in 1930
Association football clubs disestablished in 1971
Paraná Clube
Sport in Curitiba
1930 establishments in Brazil
1971 disestablishments in Brazil